The Shadow of Zorro is a 1962 Spanish western film directed by Joaquín Luis Romero Marchent, written by José Mallorquí and Jess Franco, and starring Frank Latimore, Maria Luz Galicia, Mario Feliciani, Raffaella Carrà, Robert Hundar and Gianni Santuccio.

Plot
Two brothers, Billy (Claudio Undari) and Dan (Paul Piaget), head to California, determined to hunt down and kill Zorro to avenge the death of their brother.

Their ploy, Billy will dress up as Zorro and commit a variety of atrocities, hopefully drawing the real Zorro out of retirement.

The real Zorro is Don Jose de la Torre (Frank Latimore), the richest man in California. His fiance Maria (Maria Luz Galicia) doesn’t want to see Zorro resurrected. She wants to marry and live a quiet life.

Don Jose isn’t fond of donning the mask again either.

But when Billy and Dan have trouble learning the identity of Zorro, they start capturing and threatening those who might be able to provide the answers.

Finally, it’s the brutal death of an aging servant named Raimundo that spurs Zorro back into action.

Cast

References

External links
 

Spanish Western (genre) films
1962 Western (genre) films
1962 films
Films directed by Joaquín Luis Romero Marchent
Films produced by Alberto Grimaldi
Films scored by Francesco De Masi
Films shot in Spain
Films with screenplays by José Mallorquí
Films based on works by Johnston McCulley
1960s Spanish films